Ufa is a Central Ufa railway terminus, located in the Sovetsky District of Ufa on the historical direction of the Trans-Siberian Railway.

In managerial terms, the station enters the Bashkir region of the Kuybyshev Railway.

History
The history of Ufa Station is associated with the construction of the Samara-Ufa railway. Construction on the Samara-Ufa railway began in 1885, and in 1888 it was brought to the city of Ufa. In 1888 the station began to function as the railway's final destination.

In 1890, the Ufa-Zlatoust section was built. In 1892, the Zlatoust-Chelyabinsk section was built. From the opening of traffic on the Siberian railway and on the Yekaterinburg - Chelyabinsk branch (1896) to the opening of the Petersburg-Vologda-Vyatka railway (1906), the station was located on the only rail track connecting Russia and Europe with the Urals, Siberia and the Far East.

The location for the Ufa railway station was determined in 1885, and its first building in eclectic style was operated from 1888 to 1967 (architect F. F. Essen).

Ufa Station's modern building was constructed in 1968 (project K. Gottlieb). Its reconstruction began in May, 2006. The first stage of the renovated station was open on 17 December 2008.

Parking
On the adjacent territory of the railway station there are two parkings of vehicles operating on a commercial basis. The first is located at the intersection of Karl Marx-Vokzalnaya Street, with a capacity of 200 cars, belongs Ufa Diesel-Locomotive Repair Plant, the second is located on the station square owned by APS-Mater Ltd., which is equipped with an automatic barrier and a terminal to pay for paid parking services.

On these parkings provided free time for parking. In addition, on the second level of Vokzalnaya Street, in the area of the tram stop, where there is a direct entrance to the waiting room of the railway station, parking of vehicles is permitted on both sides of the carriageway. According to the information of the Kuybyshev Railway - a branch of Russian Railways, the parking of personal vehicles at the station territory of Ufa Station since January 5, 2017 has been provided by full-time employees of APS-Master LLC on the basis of a lease agreement with Russian Railways. According to the technology of providing parking services "APS-Master" provides free-of-charge vehicles in the parking area (up to 15 minutes) for boarding-disembarking passengers. Currently, the right to free entry to the parking for 15 minutes is granted to all vehicles.

Ban stop
On both sides - from the street. K. Marx before the departure from the station square are installed road signs prohibiting the stopping and parking of vehicles: 3.27 "Stopping prohibited" with a sign of additional information 8.24 "The tow truck is working." Civil Administration of Ufa rasstanovyat limiting signs, is not justified.

Transport
No.101 Ufa Railway Station → Ufa International Airport
No.3 Dzerzhinsky Street→ Belorechensky neighbourhood
No.74 Dzerzhinsky Street→ Ufimsky DOK (Inors neighbourhood)
No.214 Dzerzhinsky Street→ Milovsky Park (Zaton neighbourhood)
No.230 Dzerzhinsky Street→ Kashkadan Park (Sipailovo neighbourhood)
No.239 Ufa Station→North Bus station
No.251 Ufa Station→ Kashkadan Park (Sipailovo neighbourhood)

Gallery

References

Transport in Ufa
Railway stations in Bashkortostan